The Queensland Railways 6D11½ class locomotive was a class of 0-6-0 steam trams operated by the Queensland Railways.

History
In June 1883, Kitson & Co delivered three steam trams and six trailers for a proposed tramway in Brisbane from Ann Street to Petrie Bight. The tramway was not built and with the locomotives considered unsuitable for railway use, they were stored. Per Queensland Railway's classification system they were designated the 6D11½ class, 6D representing they were a tank locomotive with six wheels, and the 11½ the cylinder diameter in inches.

In 1884 one was assembled at North Ipswich Railway Workshops and operated a trial from Ipswich to Brisbane. This confirmed its unsuitability for main line use, and it was instead employed as a shunter in Ipswich and South Brisbane. The other two were assembled and despatched to Maryborough in 1888. They returned south in 1893 hauling trains on the Redbank-Bundamba Loop Line. All were withdrawn in 1902.

References

Kitson locomotives
Railway locomotives introduced in 1882
6D11
0-6-0 locomotives
3 ft 6 in gauge locomotives of Australia